RRK may refer to:

 Rahsaan Roland Kirk (1935-1977), American jazz multi-instrumentalist
 Revised Romanization of Korean, the Korean language romanization system of South Korea
 R. R. Keshavamurthy (1913-2006), Indian violinist
 Reinhard Rudolf Karl Hartmann , lexicographer and linguist
 Rice–Ramsperger–Kassel theory of chemical reactions, a precursor to RRKM theory